The Duchy of Cornwall Act 1860 (23 & 24 Vict c 53), sometimes referred to as the Duchy of Cornwall (Limitation of Actions, etc.) Act 1860, was an Act of the Parliament of the United Kingdom.

The whole Act was repealed by section 1(1) of, and Part IV of Schedule 1 to, the Statute Law (Repeals) Act 1978.

References

Halsbury's Statutes,

United Kingdom Acts of Parliament 1860
Duchy of Cornwall
19th century in Cornwall